Sepia incerta is a species of cuttlefish native to the southwestern Indian Ocean, specifically south and east Africa, from Port Elizabeth to Mozambique (north to 18ºS). It is also present in the Saya-de-Malha Bank. S. incerta lives at a depth of between 90 and 345 m.

Sepia incerta grows to a mantle length of 150 mm.

The type specimen was collected near Tongaat Beach, KwaZulu-Natal and Port Elizabeth, Cape Province in South Africa. It is deposited at The Natural History Museum in London.

References

External links

Cuttlefish
Molluscs described in 1916